Syagrus is a legendary ancient Greek oral poet. He is said in a traditional list to have been a rival of Homer; elsewhere it is said that he followed Orpheus and Musaeus in chronological sequence and was the first maker of an epic on the Trojan War. This would have been a forerunner of the later poems in the Epic Cycle.

Sources 
Diogenes Laërtius, Lives of the Philosophers 2.46.
Aelian, Varia Historia 14.21.
Eustathius of Thessalonica, Commentary on the Iliad 1.6.

Early Greek epic poets
Oral epic poets